Tadeusz Kwaśniak (January 24, 1951 – July 24, 1991), known as The Towel Strangler, was a Polish pedophile and serial killer who raped and murdered 5 boys all over Poland between April 1990 and April 1991.

Crimes 
He was first reprimanded for committing lecherous acts with girls, spending a total of 12 years behind bars. After leaving Wronki Prison, Kwaśniak began a series of thefts, rapes and murders of young boys.

The first attempt took place on April 20, 1990 in Bytom on Budryka Street. Under the pretense that he had received an envelope from the 10-year-old victim's father, Kwaśniak managed to enter the child's apartment. There, he began to strangle the boy with a towel, but the boy pretended to be dead. After the perpetrator left the flat, the boy informed his parents about the event.

On May 7, 1990 in Radom, he robbed and murdered a 10-year-old boy. As before, he used a towel to strangle his victim.

On May 24, 1990 in Wrocław, he attempted to rob, rape and murder an 11-year-old boy. He accosted the boy on the street, and under the pretense of picking up an envelope from the victim's apartment, he managed to enter the apartment. There he explained that he was going to take revenge on his father because he got Kwaśniak fired. He raped the boy, and then began strangling him with a towel. The boy fainted, but managed to survive. The perpetrator sent a letter to the flat: "Revenge! I waited 14 years!"

On May 31, 1990, he carried out another murder in Szczecin. He strangled a 9-year-old boy with a towel, leaving a card next to the corpse which said: "Revenge, finally - Z."

On June 6, 1990, another boy was murdered in Kutno. Kwaśniak strangled him with a towel, after which he robbed the trap. After that, he wrote 'Revenge' on the bathroom mirror with lipstick.

On June 18, 1990, he robbed and then murdered a 9-year-old boy on Szymanowski Street in Oława. The boy was strangled with a towel; found next to him was a card with the inscription "Finally, I made the expected revenge -B." was left.

On January 3, 1991, he committed a robbery on Topolowa Street in Zbąszyń. He tricked the boy into letting him into the apartment, and then stole money, a revaluation voucher and an insurance card. Thanks to the boy, a description of the perpetrator was established, which matched the descriptions made on the basis of witness testimonies from previous acts: a man aged 30–35, well-built, a height of 1,75 cm., dark hair and carrying  a weapon.

On February 26, 1991, in Rataje, he robbed and murdered a 12-year-old boy. The boy was strangled with a towel. Witnesses who saw the man talking with the boy were quickly located, and it were able to describe what the perpetrator was wearing. The subsequent investigation to catch the murderer was given the code name Revenge. In February 1991 after sifting through numerous pieces of evidence, it was possible to connect all murders to one man. The police in Poznań collected details from previous murders, and commissioned sexologist Lechosław Gapik to develop a psychological portrait of the perpetrator. The issue was publicized by the "997" publivision program, which reconstructed the murders and gave the perpetrator a modus operandi and portrait. Thanks to these actions, it was established that the perpetrator had accosted boys in Rataje for a few days, with whose help a facial composite was made and published by the media, as well as being posted at bus stops and in taxis. For any help in catching the perpetrator, the Provincial Police Chief of Poznań set a reward of 5,000,000 Polish złoty.

Despite this, on March 7, 1991 in Wrocław, Kwaśniak raped another boy. Under the pretext of giving the parents of the boy a letter from his aunt who lived abroad, he managed to enter the apartment.

On April 18, 1991, he attacked once again Sosnowiec, but his victim managed to survive.

Arrest 
On April 22, 1991, the police in Poznań received a signal from the headmaster of Primary School No. 6 on the Rusa Housing Estate about students who were being accosted by a suspicious man. Later, the same application was made by a woman who, during a walk around the estate, noticed the same strange man. As a result of this, the man was soon detained on one of the residential streets.

During the interrogation, the man, who turned out to be Kwaśniak, admitted to the murders in Oława, Kutno, Szczecin, Radom and Poznań, to the attempted murders in Bytom and Wrocław, and to the rape in Sosnowiec. He also admitted to several dozen apartment thefts, including those in Słupsk, Białystok, Lublin, Kraków, Częstochowa, Bydgoszcz, Szczecin and Wejherowo.

Death 
On July 24, 1991, Kwaśniak committed suicide in his prison cell, hanging himself with a bandage. In connection with his death, the investigation was discontinued. He was buried at the Miłostowo cemetery on August 1, 1991.

Notes

See also
List of serial killers by country

References

Further reading 
 

1951 births
1990 crimes in Poland
1990 murders in Europe
1991 crimes in Poland
1991 murders in Europe
1991 suicides
1990s murders in Poland
Child sexual abuse in Poland
Incidents of violence against boys
Male serial killers
Polish murderers of children
Polish rapists
Polish serial killers
Serial killers who committed suicide in prison custody
Suicides by hanging in Poland
Violence against men in Europe